The 1970–71 Purdue Boilermakers men's basketball team represented Purdue University during the 1970–71 NCAA men's basketball season.

Roster

References

Purdue Boilermakers men's basketball seasons
Purdue